An indirect presidential election was held in Vietnam on 2 March 2023. The election took place early following the resignation of President Nguyễn Xuân Phúc as part of a broad anti-corruption purge led by the General Secretary of the Vietnamese Communist Party Nguyễn Phú Trọng.

The sole candidate running within Vietnam's one-party regime, Võ Văn Thưởng, was elected by the National Assembly of Vietnam. Out of 495 legislators of the National Assembly, 488 were present at the time of the election. 487 voted for Thưởng while one other voting blank.

References 

Vietnam
Presidential elections in Vietnam
2023 in Vietnam
Single-candidate elections